The boxing competitions at the 2017 Southeast Asian Games in Kuala Lumpur were held at MATRADE Exhibition and Convention Centre in Segambut.

The 2017 Games will feature competitions in six events (all events for men).

Events
The following events will be contested:

Schedule

Participation

Participating nations

Medal summary

Medal table

Men's events

References

External links
  

 
2017 Southeast Asian Games events
2017
Southeast Asian Games